Chiwetel Umeadi Ejiofor   (born 10 July 1977) is a British actor. He is the recipient of various accolades, including a BAFTA Award, a Laurence Olivier Award, an NAACP Image Award, and nominations for an Academy Award, two Primetime Emmy Awards, three Screen Actors Guild Awards and five Golden Globe Awards.

After enrolling at the National Youth Theatre in 1995 and attending the London Academy of Music and Dramatic Art, at age 19 and three months into his course, Ejiofor was cast by Steven Spielberg to play a supporting role in the film Amistad (1997) as James Covey.

Ejiofor portrayed the characters Okwe in Dirty Pretty Things (2002), Lola in Kinky Boots, Victor Sweet in Four Brothers, The Operative in Serenity (all 2005), Luke in Children of Men (2006), Thabo Mbeki in Endgame, Adrian Helmsley in Roland Emmerich's 2012 (both 2009), Darryl Peabody in Salt (2010), Solomon Northup in 12 Years a Slave (2013), Vincent Kapoor in Ridley Scott's The Martian (2015), Karl Mordo in Doctor Strange (2016) and Doctor Strange in the Multiverse of Madness (2022), and Trywell Kamkwamba in The Boy Who Harnessed the Wind (2019). He voiced Dr. Watson in Sherlock Gnomes (2018) and Scar in the 2019 remake of The Lion King and featured in the fantasy film Maleficent: Mistress of Evil. For 12 Years a Slave, he received Academy Award and Golden Globe Award nominations, along with the BAFTA Award for Best Actor. He was nominated for a 2014 Primetime Emmy Award for Outstanding Lead Actor in a Limited Series or Movie for his performance on Dancing on the Edge. In 2022, he played the lead role in the Showtime science fiction television series The Man Who Fell to Earth.

In 2008, he was appointed Officer of the Order of the British Empire by Queen Elizabeth II for services to the arts. He was elevated to Commander of the Order of the British Empire in the 2015 Birthday Honours.

Early life 
Ejiofor was born on 10 July 1977 in Forest Gate, east London, to middle-class Nigerian parents of Igbo descent. His father, Arinze, was a doctor, and his mother, Obiajulu, was a pharmacist. His younger sister, Zain, is a CNN correspondent. His other sister Kandi is a GP doctor.

In 1988, when Ejiofor was 11, during a family trip to Nigeria for a wedding, he and his father were driving to Lagos after the celebrations when their car was involved in a head-on crash with a lorry. His father was killed, and Ejiofor was badly injured, receiving scars that are still visible on his forehead.

Ejiofor began acting in school plays at his junior school, Dulwich Prep London (known at the time as 'Dulwich College Preparatory School'), where he played the gravedigger in William Shakespeare's Hamlet. He continued acting at his senior school, Dulwich College and joined the National Youth Theatre. He got into the London Academy of Music and Dramatic Art but left after his first year, after being cast in Steven Spielberg's film Amistad. He played the title role in Othello at the Bloomsbury Theatre in September 1995, and again at the Theatre Royal, Glasgow, in 1996, when he starred opposite Rachael Stirling as Desdemona.

Career

1996–2007: Career beginnings and early recognition
Ejiofor made his film debut in the television film Deadly Voyage (1996). He went on to become a stage actor in London. In Steven Spielberg's Amistad, he gave support to Djimon Hounsou's Cinque as interpreter Ensign James Covey. In 1999, he appeared in the British film G:MT – Greenwich Mean Time. In 2000, he starred in Blue/Orange at the Royal National Theatre (Cottesloe stage), and later at the Duchess Theatre. That same year, his performance as Romeo in William Shakespeare's Romeo and Juliet was nominated for the Ian Charleson Award. Ejiofor was awarded the Jack Tinker Award for Most Promising Newcomer at the Critics' Circle Theatre Awards in 2000. For his performance in Blue/Orange, Ejiofor received the London Evening Standard Theatre Award for Outstanding Newcomer in 2000 and a nomination for the Laurence Olivier Award for Best Supporting Actor in 2001.

Ejiofor had his first leading film role playing Nicky Burkett in Jeremy Cameron's It Was an Accident (2000). In 2002, he starred in Dirty Pretty Things, for which he won a British Independent Film Award for best actor. In the following year, he was part of the ensemble cast of Love Actually, starred in a BBC adaptation of Chaucer's The Knight's Tale and also starred on the BBC series Trust. Also in 2003, he starred in the lead role of Augustus in the radio production of Rita Dove's poetic drama "The Darker Face of the Earth", which premiered on the BBC World Service on 23 August of that year, marking the International Day for the Remembrance of the Slave Trade and its Abolition. He starred alongside Hilary Swank in Red Dust (2004), portraying the fictional politician Alex Mpondo of post-apartheid South Africa.

He played the central role of Prince Alamayou in Peter Spafford's radio play I Was a Stranger, broadcast on BBC Radio 4 on 17 May 2004, and he played the god Dionysus, alongside Paul Scofield's Cadmus and Diana Rigg's Agave, in Andrew Rissik's play, Dionysus, based upon Euripides' Bacchae, also broadcast by the BBC. He also received acclaim for his performance as a complex antagonist The Operative in the film Serenity (2005). Ejiofor played a revolutionary in the film Children of Men (2006). His singing and acting performance in Kinky Boots received a Golden Globe Award and British Independent Film Award nomination. He was also nominated for the BAFTA Orange Rising Star Award in 2006, which recognises emerging British film talent. Ejiofor's performance in Tsunami: The Aftermath received a Golden Globe Award nomination for Best Actor – Miniseries or Television Film in 2007.

In 2007, Ejiofor starred opposite Don Cheadle in Talk to Me, a film based on the true story of Ralph "Petey" Greene (played by Cheadle), an African-American radio personality in the 1960s and 1970s. He performed on stage in The Seagull at the Royal Court Theatre from 18 January to 17 March 2007, then later that year reprised his role as Othello at the Donmar Warehouse, alongside Kelly Reilly as Desdemona and Ewan McGregor as Iago. The production received favourable reviews, with particularly strong praise for Ejiofor. "Chiwetel Ejiofor produces one of the most memorable performances of Othello in recent years". He was awarded the Laurence Olivier Award for Best Actor for his performance. He also narrated the BBC television film Partition: The Day India Burned (2007), which was based on the Partition of India. He starred as Mike Terry in the 2008 cult film Redbelt that received favourable reviews.

2008–2018: International recognition and critical acclaim
Ejiofor was appointed Officer of the Order of the British Empire (OBE) in the 2008 Birthday Honours. In the same year, he made his directorial debut in the short film Slapper, which he also wrote, based on an idea by editor/director Yusuf Pirhasan. Ejiofor appeared alongside John Cusack in the film 2012 (2009). The film went on to gross over $700 million, and is among the list of highest-grossing films of all time and placing 5th of top films of 2009. He played CIA officer Darryl Peabody in Salt (2010), and the Golden Globe Award-nominated leading role of band creator Louis Lester on the BBC Two drama series Dancing on the Edge (2013), which played on Starz in the United States.

In 2013, Ejiofor took on the role of Solomon Northup in 12 Years a Slave. The film was based on Northup's memoir, edited in 1968 by historians Sue Eakin and Joseph Logsdon, of Northup's experience as a free black man in New York, who was kidnapped in 1841 and sold into slavery in Louisiana. On casting, director Steve McQueen said:Chiwetel Ejiofor was always going to be Solomon Northup for me. I was looking for someone that had that genteelness, that kind of humanity. Knowing that humanity was going to be tested under certain duress and circumstances, I needed a person who could actually keep hold of that, even through periods of extraordinary trying and extraordinary situations where it would be tested to its absolute limit. He was the only person.At the Toronto International Film Festival, Ejiofor said he briefly hesitated about playing Northup. "You wait all your life for a great script to come through the door. You're hassling your agent and all that, and then it comes and you read it and your first reaction surprises you. Your first reaction being, 'Can I do this?'" He accepted the role about 24 hours later. As part of his preparation, Ejiofor learned to play the violin, collected slave stories, maintained a slave's edge up hairstyle, and engaged in some of the physical labour that Northup did like picking cotton. Since he had not worked with McQueen before, Ejiofor also observed the working dynamic between the director and co-star Michael Fassbender, who worked with McQueen on Hunger (2008) and Shame (2011). On playing Northup, Ejiofor did feel a responsibility, not being American, to get the story of Solomon Northup as current he could, adding "I've been very grateful to show the film to his descendants and see them be so proud of it."

12 Years a Slave opened to wide acclaim, with many critics citing Ejiofor's performance and declaring him an almost-certain Academy Award nominee for Best Actor. From Owen Gleiberman at Entertainment Weekly: "It is Chiwetel Ejiofor's extraordinary performance that holds the movie together, and that allows us to watch it without blinking. He plays Solomon with a powerful inner strength, yet he never soft-pedals the silent nightmare that is Solomon's daily existence." From Christopher Orr at The Atlantic: "Ejiofor has given notable performances in the past (Dirty Pretty Things, Serenity, Talk to Me), but this is by far his most essential role to date. Stoic, watchful, compromising himself just enough to stay alive, he is the point of stillness and decency around which spin the madnesses of the film." In his The Hollywood Reporter review, Todd McCarthy wrote, "Ejiofor is terrific in a demanding character who's put through the wringer physically, mentally and emotionally." On 16 January 2014, Ejiofor was officially nominated for Best Actor for the 86th Academy Awards on 2 March.

As of September 2013, Ejiofor was slated to portray Patrice Lumumba in a film adaptation of Aimé Césaire's A Season in the Congo, a role in which he had performed on stage at the Young Vic. Joe Wright, who directed the play, was to also direct the film.

In 2014, Ejiofor starred in the Nigerian film Half of a Yellow Sun alongside Thandiwe Newton.

It was announced in June 2014 that Ejiofor would play real-life drug dealer Thomas McFadden in film based on the book Marching Powder: A True Story of Friendship, Cocaine, and South America's Strangest Jail, written by McFadden and Australian journalist Rusty Young. In 2016, Ejiofor co-starred with his friend Benedict Cumberbatch and played Karl Mordo in the Marvel Cinematic Universe film Doctor Strange. That same year, it was announced that he would play Peter in the upcoming film Mary Magdalene, written by Helen Edmundson and directed by Garth Davis.
On 1 November 2017, he was officially chosen for the role of Scar for the computer animated remake, The Lion King (2019) directed by Jon Favreau. Played by Jeremy Irons in the 1994 animated film, Ejiofor described Scar as more "psychologically possessed" and "brutalized" than in the original. Ejiofor stated, "especially with Scar, whether it's a vocal quality that allows for a certain confidence or a certain aggression, to always know that at the end of it you're playing somebody who has the capacity to turn everything on its head in a split second with outrageous acts of violence – that can completely change the temperature of a scene." He also said that "[Scar and Mufasa's] relationship is completely destroyed and brutalized by Scar's way of thinking. He's possessed with this disease of his own ego and his own want." Favreau said of casting Ejiofor, "[He] is just a fantastic actor, who brings us a bit of the mid-Atlantic cadence and a new take on the character. He brings that feeling of a Shakespearean villain to bear because of his background as an actor. It's wonderful when you have somebody as experienced and seasoned as Chiwetel; he just breathes such wonderful life into this character." Ejiofor narrated the 2019 documentary film The Elephant Queen.

2019–present: Directorial debut with The Boy Who Harnessed the Wind
In 2019, Ejiofor made his feature directorial debut with The Boy Who Harnessed the Wind, adapted from the memoir of the same name from William Kamkwamba, about a boy who built a wind-powered water pump in Malawi. In 2022, Ejiofor returned to the role of Mordo for the sequel film Doctor Strange in the Multiverse of Madness.

Personal life and legacy 
In 2015, Ejiofor was honoured with a Global Promise Award by The GEANCO Foundation, a non-profit welfare organisation in West Africa, for his charity work in Nigeria.

On 12 September 2016, Ejiofor, as well as Cate Blanchett, Jesse Eisenberg, Peter Capaldi, Douglas Booth, Neil Gaiman, Keira Knightley, Juliet Stevenson, Kit Harington and Stanley Tucci, featured in a video from the United Nations' refugee agency UNHCR to help raise awareness of the global refugee crisis. The video, titled "What They Took With Them", has the actors reading a poem, written by Jenifer Toksvig and inspired by primary accounts of real refugees, and is part of UNHCR's #WithRefugees campaign, which also includes a petition to governments to expand asylum to provide further shelter, integrating job opportunities, and education. Ejiofor is a supporter of Crystal Palace F.C.

Filmography

Film

Television

Theatre

Awards and nominations 

Ejiofor is the recipient of several awards, including numerous nominations in the Best Actor category for his role as Solomon Northup in the 2013 biographical drama film 12 Years a Slave, of which he won the AACTA International, BAFTA, BET, Black Reel awards, in addition to several critical accolades. His other acclaimed roles include: as Othello in a 2007 Donmar Warehouse production of the play of the same name, which won him the Laurence Olivier Award for Best Actor; as geologist Adrian Helmsley in the 2009 apocalyptic disaster blockbuster 2012, which garnered worldwide commercial success, with a box-office growth of over 769 million dollars (the fifth-highest of any film that year and the highest for its week of release), which earned him nominations for a Black Reel and NAACP Image Award; as Louis Lester in the BBC miniseries Dancing on the Edge (2013), for which he was nominated for an Emmy, Golden Globe and Satellite award for outstanding lead actor in a miniseries or movie, and won a Black Reel Award in the same category; as the narrator of the 2018 Apple TV+ documentary film The Elephant Queen, for which he was nominated for the Primetime Emmy Award for Outstanding Narrator; and as the director and screenwriter of the 2019 British drama film The Boy Who Harnessed the Wind, which saw him receive nominations for the Black Reel Award for Outstanding Breakthrough Screenwriter, two British Independent Film Awards (Best Supporting Actor and Best Debut Director), the NAACP Image Award for Outstanding Directing in a Motion Picture and the Alfred P. Sloan Prize―winning the latter two.

In 2008, he was appointed Officer of the Order of the British Empire by Queen Elizabeth II for services to the arts. He was elevated to Commander of the Order of the British Empire in the 2015 Birthday Honours.

References

External links 

 
 
 
 

1977 births
Living people
Alumni of the London Academy of Music and Dramatic Art
Audiobook narrators
Best Actor AACTA International Award winners
Best Actor BAFTA Award winners
Black British male actors
British expatriate male actors in the United States
British male stage actors
Commanders of the Order of the British Empire
Critics' Circle Theatre Award winners
English expatriates in the United States
English male film actors
English male radio actors
English male Shakespearean actors
English male stage actors
English male television actors
English male video game actors
English male voice actors
English people of Igbo descent
Independent Spirit Award for Best Supporting Male winners
Laurence Olivier Award winners
Male actors from London
National Youth Theatre members
People educated at Dulwich College
People from Forest Gate
20th-century British male actors
21st-century British male actors